Dorsal nucleus of thalamus may refer to:

 Lateral dorsal nucleus of thalamus
 Medial dorsal nucleus of thalamus